They'd Rather Be Right (also known as The Forever Machine) is a science fiction novel by American writers Mark Clifton and Frank Riley.

Plot

Two professors create an advanced cybernetic brain, which they call "Bossy." Bossy can "optimise your mind...and give you eternal youth into the bargain, but only if you're ready to abandon all your favourite prejudices." However, when given the choice of admitting they were wrong and therefore being able to benefit from Bossy's abilities, most people would rather be right, and Bossy's ability to confer immortality is almost made ineffective by humanity's fear of "her."

Reception and significance

They'd Rather Be Right somewhat controversially won the Hugo Award for best novel in 1955, the second Hugo ever presented for a novel.

In a brief 1982 review of a contemporary reprint of the novel, author David Langford wrote that "though it contains an interesting idea, the book seems an implausible award-winner. It's fine (...) to postulate a machine giving immortality, youth and a perfect complexion to those and only those who can cast aside preconceptions and prejudices (...) The idea, though, is flattened into the ground by the authors' reluctance to do the work which would make it convincing."

Langford has also addressed conspiracy theories attributing They'd Rather Be Right's win to Scientology, saying it is more likely that Clifton was popular for his short stories.

Galaxy Science Fiction reviewer Floyd C. Gale faulted the novel, saying, "although a passably workmanlike job, loose ends outnumber neat knits in this yarn."

In 2008 Sam Jordison described the novel as "appalling," the "worst ever winner [of the Hugo Award]," and "a basic creative writing 'how not to,'" saying that its win "by public vote (...) raises serious questions about the value of a universal franchise." Similarly, author Lawrence Watt-Evans has stated that They'd Rather Be Right is "the usual [book] cited" as the "worst book ever to win [the Hugo Award]", and author Rick Cook responded to the question of "Is the book any good?" with "No," going on to explain its origins as "one of those tailored-to-order serials for the old Astounding. Sometimes those things worked and sometimes they didn't. This one didn't."

Publication history

They'd Rather Be Right was first published as a four-part serial in Astounding Science Fiction from August 1954 to November 1954.  It was published as a book in 1957, and a heavily cut version was released the following year under the title The Forever Machine.  The novel has been reprinted a few times in the decades since, including at least two foreign language translations.

They'd Rather Be Right is a sequel to "Crazy Joey" by Mark Clifton with Alex Apostolides
(August 1953, originally published in Astounding Science Fiction) and "Hide! Hide! Witch!" by Mark Clifton with Alex Apostolides (December 1953, originally published in Astounding Science Fiction).

The stories "Crazy Joey" and "Hide! Hide! Witch!" appeared without They'd Rather Be Right in The Science Fiction of Mark Clifton, edited by Barry N. Malzberg and Martin H. Greenberg (Southern Illinois University Press; December 8, 1980). 

In 1992, Carroll & Graf Publishers confusingly re-issued They'd Rather Be Right with its
two prequel stories, "Crazy Joey" and "Hide! Hide! Witch!", under the title
The Forever Machine.  In this volume, the stories "Crazy Joey" and "Hide! Hide! Witch!"
comprise the first section, entitled "Crazy Joey," while the novel They'd Rather Be Right
makes up the second section, entitled "Bossy."

References

Sources

External links
 
 1982 Review of They'd Rather Be Right (Starblaze Editions, 1982) by Dave Langford 

1954 American novels
1954 science fiction novels
American science fiction novels
Collaborative novels
Hugo Award for Best Novel-winning works
Works originally published in Analog Science Fiction and Fact
Novels first published in serial form
Gnome Press books